The Demi-Paradise (also known as Adventure for Two) is a 1943 British comedy film made by Two Cities Films. It stars Laurence Olivier as a Soviet Russian inventor who travels to England to have his revolutionary propeller manufactured, and Penelope Dudley-Ward as the woman who falls in love with him. It was directed by Anthony Asquith and produced by Anatole de Grunwald and Filippo Del Giudice from a screenplay by de Grunwald. The music score was by Nicholas Brodszky and the cinematography by Bernard Knowles. The film was shot at Denham Studios with sets designed by the art director Carmen Dillon.

The film is a gentle satire on the values the English hold so dear. It was designed to encourage sympathy between Britain and the Soviet Union. The film's title is a reference to John of Gaunt's famous speech in Richard II which begins:
This royal throne of kings, this scepter'd isle,
This earth of majesty, this seat of Mars,
This other Eden, demi-paradise

Plot summary
Ivan Kouznetsoff (Laurence Olivier), a Russian inventor, travels to England to introduce the British shipping industry to his newly invented and improved propeller blade. There he meets socialite Anne Tisdall (Penelope Dudley-Ward), and falls for her. Meeting Anne and hearing her views turn his own previous conceptions about the capitalist system and its degenerates upside down. After a lovers' quarrel, Ivan heads back to Russian only to be recalled to England a year later to smooth out imperfections in his design. Despite his efforts, his modifications prove to be unsound and he seems destined to return to the Soviet Union in disgrace.

Anne convinces the local shipbuilders to work around the clock in order to realise the revolutionary propeller. Soon they solve the problem, and there is a very successful launch of the new line of ships. Ivan can return to the Soviet Union to aid the war effort, enriched by Anne's love.

Cast

 Laurence Olivier as Ivan Kouznetsoff
 Penelope Dudley-Ward as Ann Tisdall 
 Marjorie Fielding as Mrs. Tisdall
 Margaret Rutherford as Rowena Ventnor
 Felix Aylmer as Mr. Runalow
George Thorpe as Herbert Tisdall
 Leslie Henson as himself
 Guy Middleton as Dick Christian
 Michael Shepley as Mr. Walford
 Edie Martin as Miss Winifred Tisdall
 Muriel Aked as Mrs. Tisdall-Stanton
 Joyce Grenfell as Sybil Paulson
 Everley Gregg as Mrs. Flannel
 Jack Watling as Tom
 David Keir as Jordan
 Aubrey Mallalieu as Toomes, the Butler
 Beatrice Harrison as herself
 Miles Malleson as Theatre Cashier
 John Laurie as Wounded sailor
 Brian Nissen as George Tisdall
 George Cole as Percy
 Harry Fowler as Evacuee 
 Marie Ault as	Mrs. Jones
 Gladys Henson as Mrs. Frost 
 John Boxer as 	British Sailor
 Alexis Chesnakov as Russian Delegate 
 Josephine Middleton	as	Mrs. Tremlow 
 Margaret Withers as 	Mrs. Elliston 
 Charles Paton as Mr. Bishop
 Wilfrid Hyde-White  as Nightclub Waiter
 Mavis Clair	as	Barmaid

References

External links
 
 
 

1943 films
1943 romantic comedy films
British romantic comedy films
British satirical films
British black-and-white films
Universal Pictures films
Films directed by Anthony Asquith
Films with screenplays by Anatole de Grunwald
Films produced by Anatole de Grunwald
Films set in London
Films shot at Denham Film Studios
Two Cities Films films
Films set in 1941
1940s English-language films
1940s British films